St John the Evangelist, Knotty Ash, is a church in the Knotty Ash area of Liverpool, Merseyside, England.
It is on Thomas Lane and was built 1834–6.

The architects were Williams and Edwards and it was built by Richard and Paul Barker of Huyton in red ashlar sandstone. There is a narrow west tower with recessed spire and thin polygonal buttresses. It has tall church sides with three light perpendicular windows and thin buttresses. The taller chancel with south chapel is an 1890 addition by Aldridge and Deacon. There is an excellent late 19th century Celtic cross in the churchyard, finely carved.  The churchyard contains war graves of three soldiers, a Royal Navy sailor and a Royal Air Force officer of World War I and three soldiers and an airman of World War II.

Images

See also
Grade II listed buildings in Liverpool-L14

References

 The Buildings of England; Lancashire: Liverpool and the South-West; by Richard Pollard and Nikolaus Pevsner 

Churches in Liverpool
Knotty Ash
Knotty Ash